Jacqulyn Buglisi is an American choreographer, artistic director, dancer, educator, and founder or co-founder of multiple dance institutions. She received the 2020 Bessie Award, Special Citation for the Table of Silence Project 9/11. Buglisi, with Terese Capucilli, Christine Dakin and Donlin Foreman, founded Buglisi Dance Theatre in 1993/94 (formerly BuglisiForeman Dance).

Choreography 
Buglisi's ballets are highly visual and imagistic dances that draw from literature, history and heroic archetypes as primary sources. Buglisi's ballets are rooted in strong physical technique. Her repertoire of more than eighty works has been presented at venues across the United States including:

 John F. Kennedy Center for the Performing Arts
 Joyce Theater
 Jacob's Pillow Dance Festival
 Lincoln Center
 Society for the Performing Arts, Wortham Theater Center, Cullen Theater, Houston
 Kravis Center for the Performing Arts
 Spring to Dance Festival, St. Louis
 SUNY Purchase Performing Arts Center – Concert Hall
 Richard B. Fisher Center for the Performing Arts – Sosnoff Theater
 University of Arizona – Centennial Hall

Internationally, her works have appeared at the Melbourne International Festival, State Theater; during International Dance Week in Prague; Sadler Wells London, Rovereto Festival Italy, the Czech Republic, Japan, Italy, France and Israel.

Lynn Garafola of Dance Magazine wrote, "Buglisi is a rarity in today's world, a woman who delights in the many splendid forms of female being. Probably no woman, other than Graham, has plumbed such emotional depths choreographically" and for Buglisi's www.UndertheButtonwoodTree.com commissioned by LMCC, Alastair Macaulay of The New York Times wrote, "Cecil B. DeMille would have been proud".

Buglisi collaborated with Venezuelan environmental painter and filmmaker Jacobo Borges to create her trilogy, Rain (score by Glen Velez), Sand (music by Philip Glass), and Blue Cathedral (music by Jennifer Higdon. Other collaborations include composer Jack Mehler.

The Table of Silence Project 9/11

The project was created by Buglisi and Italian artist Rosella Vasta. Performances of this project have occurred annually at the Lincoln Center on September 11 since its debut in 2011. It is a public tribute and ritual performances honoring peace and tolerance. Live streaming reaches 223 countries/territories and all 50 states. Other Table of Silence Site-specific commemorations were presented at the Pan Am 103 Remembrance Wall during the company's NYSCA residency at Syracuse University; in Perugia and Assisi, Italy; and UC Santa Barbara on May 23, 2016, to mark the anniversary of a mass-shooting near the campus. 

Her company's repertoire is archived for public viewing at the Jerome Robbins Dance Division of the New York Public Library.

Dancer 

During her 30-year association with the Martha Graham Dance Company, Buglisi danced as a principal artist for 12 years, performing the classic roles such as the Three Mary's (El Penitente), Andromache (Cortege of Eagles), the Warrior (Seraphic Dialogue), the Lament (Acts of Light), the Girl in Yellow (Diversion of Angels), Leader of the Night Journey Chorus and Jocasta (Night Journey), Creusa (Cave of the Heart), The Spectator (Every Soul is a Circus) and in Tangled Night created for her by Martha Graham. She danced in Graham's honor on the nationally televised CBS Presentation of the Kennedy Center Honors and is featured in the PBS film, An Evening of Dance and Conversation with Martha Graham. 

Coached by Jane Sherman, Buglisi performed the solos of Ruth St. Denis at Jacob's Pillow and internationally, including Lyon Biennale De La Dancse, on film in Trailblazers of American Modern Dance, and also in the film, The Spirit of Denishawn.

Educator 
Buglisi has been commissioned by The Juilliard School's Emerging Modern Masters Series, Ailey/Fordham University B.F.A. Program, the University of Richmond, California State University/Long Beach, George Mason University, Purchase Conservatory of Dance, Interlochen Center for the Arts, the State Ballet College of Oslo, Oklahoma Arts Institute, Jacob's Pillow Dance Festival, Boston Conservatory of Music, Randolph-Macon College and National Dance Institute, among others.

In 1970, Buglisi founded the first school of contemporary dance for the community of Spoleto, Italy, and was the Master Artist-in-Residence at the Atlantic Center for the Arts. She has taught for the Dance Aspen Festival from 1990 to 1995, the Julio Bocca Center in Argentina, the Victoria College in Melbourne in 1999, and the Chautauqua Institution and Festival from 1995 to 2005.

As a resident teacher in New York City, she has been chairperson of the Modern Department at The Ailey School, has served on the faculty of The Juilliard School from 1991 to 2005, The Martha Graham School of Contemporary Dance since 1977, and Ballet Hispanico School of Dance. Buglisi guest teaches at the LaGuardia High School of the Performing Arts (alumna) and instructs workshops at Steps on Broadway and Peridance Capezio Center. 

She was named honorary chair for the Marymount Manhattan College 2005 Gala and served as a panelist for both the Heinz Family Foundation and the New Jersey State Council for the Arts. Buglisi holds creative and educational residencies at Kaatsbaan International Dance Center, Munson-Williams-Proctor Arts-Institute, SUNY Purchase, California State University, Long Beach, George Mason University, University of Richmond, The Mahayfee Theater Class Act in FSU at Tallahassee, Petersburg Florida, and Syracuse University.

Buglisi served on the Dance/USA's Board of Trustees as Chair of Artistic Director's Council from 2010 to 2013.

Accolades 
Buglisi's awards and honors include the American Dance Guild Award for Artistic Excellence, Italian International Lifetime Achievement Award 2016, Fiorello LaGuardia Award for Excellence in the field of Dance, The 2014 Kaatsbaan International Playing Field Award, The Gertrude Shurr Award for Dance, Altria Group's 2007 Women Choreographer Initiative Award, as well as grants for new work from the National Endowment for the Arts, New York State Council on the Arts, NYC Department of Cultural Affairs, Harkness Foundation for Dance, Howard Gilman Foundation, and The O'Donnell-Green Music & Dance Foundation.

Jacqulyn Buglisi received the Juilliard President’s Metal, and the 2021 Bessie’s Awards Special Citation for Table of Silence Project 9/11.

See also

 List of choreographers
 List of people from New York City

References

External links
 Official website, Buglisi Dance Theatre. 
Official website, Table of Silence Project 9/11. 

20th-century births
20th-century American dancers
20th-century American educators

21st-century American educators
American women choreographers
American choreographers
American theatre directors
American female dancers
Dancers from New York (state)
American founders
American artistic directors
Entertainers from New York City
Living people
Women theatre directors
Women founders
Year of birth missing (living people)
Educators from New York City
20th-century American women educators
21st-century American women educators